The Aṅgulimālīya Sūtra (Taishō 120) is a Mahāyāna Buddhist scripture belonging to the Tathāgatagarbha class of sūtra, which teach that the Buddha is eternal, that the non-Self and emptiness teachings only apply to the worldly sphere and not to Nirvāṇa, and that the Tathāgatagarbha is real and immanent within all beings and all phenomena. The sutra consists mostly of stanzas in verse.

The Mahāyāna Aṅgulimālīya Sūtra should not be confused with the Pāli Canon's Angulimala Sutta, which is a completely different work included in the Majjhima Nikaya.

Origins and history 
According to Stephen Hodge, internal textual evidence in the Aṅgulimālīya Sūtra, Mahābherihāraka Parivarta Sūtra, and the Mahāyāna Mahāparinirvāṇa Sūtra, indicates that these texts were first circulated in southern India, and they then gradually propagated up to the northwest, with Kashmir being the other major center. The Aṅgulimālīya Sūtra gives a more detailed account by mentioning the points of distribution as including southern India, the Vindhya Range, Bharukaccha, and Kashmir. Hodge summarizes his findings as follows:

In the 6th century CE, Paramārtha wrote that the Mahāsāṃghikas revere the sūtras which teach the Tathāgatagarbha.

Central teachings 
The Aṅgulimālīya Sūtra consists largely of teachings by Aṅgulimālīya on the correct understanding of Buddhist doctrine. According to Michael Radich, 

The sutra is most insistent that the Tathāgatagarbha and the self (Ātman) are real and that to deny their existence is to lapse into a state of dangerous spiritual imbalance. Thus, to seek out the Tathāgatagarbha — which is equated with the true Self — is deemed of great value. The Buddha teaches the bodhisattva Mañjuśrī that practicing the spiritual life is meaningful only because there is a 'self principle' (the Tathāgatagarbha or 'atma-dhatu' - 'essence of Self') with which the quest can be rewarded. He states:

The sutra is remarkable for the vigor and passion with which Aṅgulimālīya teaches the Dharma and for its doctrine that at the heart of all beings is one unified principle: the buddha-dhatu (Buddha-nature) or Tathāgatagarbha. The doctrines of this sutra are also strikingly congruent with those of the much longer Mahāyāna Mahāparinirvāṇa Sūtra.

See also 
Anunatva-Apurnatva-Nirdesa
Dolpopa Sherab Gyaltsen
Eternal Buddha
Parinirvana
Purity in Buddhism
Śrīmālādevī Sūtra
Tathāgatagarbha Sūtra
Mahaparinirvana Sutra

References

External links
 Sūtra of Aṅgulimālika, translated into English by Rulu from Guṇabhadra's Chinese version

Mahayana texts
Mahayana sutras
Shentong